Human sacrifice was common in many parts of Mesoamerica,  so the rite was nothing new to the Aztecs when they arrived at the Valley of Mexico,  nor was it something unique to pre-Columbian Mexico. Other Mesoamerican cultures,  such as the Purépechas and Toltecs, and the Maya  performed  sacrifices as well and from archaeological evidence,  it probably existed since the time of the Olmecs (1200–400 BC),  and perhaps even throughout the early farming cultures of the region. However,  the extent of human sacrifice is unknown among several Mesoamerican civilizations. What distinguished Aztec practice from Maya human sacrifice was the way in which it was embedded in everyday life. These cultures also notably sacrificed elements of their own population to the gods.

In 1519, explorers such as Hernán Cortés conquered the Aztec capital of Tenochtitlan and made observations of and wrote reports about the practice of human sacrifice. Bernal Díaz del Castillo,  who participated in the Cortés expedition,  made frequent mention of human sacrifice in his memoir True History of the Conquest of New Spain. There are a number of second-hand accounts of human sacrifices written by Spanish friars,  that relate to the testimonies of native eyewitnesses. The literary accounts have been supported by archeological research. 

Since the late 1970s,  excavations of the offerings in the Great Pyramid of Tenochtitlan,  and other archaeological sites, have provided physical evidence, of human sacrifice among the Mesoamerican peoples. As of 2020, archaeologists have found 603 human skulls at the Hueyi Tzompantli in the archeological zone of the Templo Mayor.

A wide variety of interpretations of the Aztec practice of human sacrifice have been proposed by modern scholars. Many scholars now believe that Aztec human sacrifice, especially during troubled times like pandemic or other crises, was performed in honor of the gods. Most scholars of Pre-Columbian civilization see human sacrifice among the Aztecs as a part of the long cultural tradition of human sacrifice in Mesoamerica.

Role of sacrifice in Aztec culture

Sacrifice was a common theme in the Aztec culture. In the Aztec "Legend of the Five Suns",  all the gods sacrificed themselves so that mankind could live. Some years after the Spanish conquest of the Aztec Empire,  a body of the Franciscans confronted the remaining Aztec priesthood and demanded,  under threat of death,  that they desist from this traditional practice. The Aztec priests defended themselves as follows:

What the Aztec priests were referring to was a cardinal Mesoamerican belief: that a great and continuing sacrifice by the gods sustains the Universe. A strong sense of indebtedness was connected with this worldview. Indeed, nextlahualli (debt-payment) was a commonly used metaphor for human sacrifice,  and, as Bernardino de Sahagún reported, it was said that the victim was someone who "gave his service".

Human sacrifice was in this sense the highest level of an entire panoply of offerings through which the Aztecs sought to repay their debt to the gods. Both Sahagún and Toribio de Benavente (also called "Motolinía") observed that the Aztecs gladly parted with everything. Even the "stage" for human sacrifice, the massive temple-pyramids, was an offering mound: crammed with the land's finest art, treasure and victims; they were then buried underneath for the deities.

Additionally,  the sacrifice of animals was a common practice,  for which the Aztecs bred dogs,  eagles,  jaguars and deer. The cult of Quetzalcoatl required the sacrifice of butterflies and hummingbirds.

Self-sacrifice was also quite common; people would offer maguey thorns,  tainted with their own blood and would offer blood from their tongues,  ear lobes,  or genitals. Blood held a central place in Mesoamerican cultures. The 16th-century Florentine Codex by Franciscan friar Bernardino de Sahagún reports that in one of the creation myths,  Quetzalcóatl offered blood extracted from a wound in his own penis to give life to humanity. There are several other myths in which Nahua gods offer their blood to help humanity.

Another theory is that human sacrifice was used to supply protein and other vital nutrients in the absence of large game animals, though this argument is controversial.

It is debated whether these rites functioned as a type of atonement for Aztec believers. Some scholars argue that the role of sacrifice was to assist the gods in maintaining the cosmos,  and not as an act of propitiation. Aztec society viewed even the slightest tlatlacolli ('sin' or 'insult') as an extremely malevolent supernatural force. To avoid such calamities befalling their community,  those who had erred punished themselves by extreme measures such as slitting their tongues for vices of speech or their ears for vices of listening. Other methods of atoning wrongdoings included hanging themselves,  or throwing themselves down precipices.[16]

What has been gleaned from all of this is that the sacrificial role entailed a great deal of social expectation and a certain degree of acquiescence.

Holistic assessment

Flower wars

According to Diego Durán's History of the Indies of New Spain (and a few other sources that are believed to be based on the Crónica X),  the Flower wars were a ritual among the cities of Aztec Triple Alliance and Tlaxcala,  Huexotzingo and Cholula. This form of ritual was introduced probably after the mid-1450s following droughts, as famine caused many deaths in the Mexican highlands. The droughts and damage to crops were believed to be punishment by gods who felt unappreciated and improperly honored. Therefore,  the Flower wars provided victims for human sacrificial offerings in a highly structured and ceremonial manner.

This type of warfare differed from regular political warfare,  as the Flower wars were also an opportunity for combat training and as first exposure to combat for new soldiers. In addition,  regular warfare included the use of long range weapons such as atlatl darts,  stones,  and sling shots to damage the enemy from afar. During the Flower wars,  warriors were expected to fight up close and exhibit their combat abilities while aiming to injure the enemy,  rather than kill them. The main objective of Aztec Flower warfare was to capture victims alive for later ritual execution,  and offerings to the gods. Being killed the Flower wars, considered much more noble than dying in a regular military battle, was religiously more prestigious, as these dead were given the privilege to live in heaven with the war god,  Huitzilopochtli.

Sacrifice ritual
Human sacrifice rituals were performed at the appropriate times each month or festival with the appropriate number of living bodies,  and other goods. These individuals were previously chosen to be sacrificed,  as was the case for people embodying the gods themselves,  or members of an enemy party which had been captured and prepared to be sacrificed. Even enemies of the Aztecs understood their roles as sacrifices to the gods since many also practiced the same type of religion.  For many rites,  the victims were expected to bless children,  greet and cheer passers-by,  hear people's petitions to the gods,  visit people in their homes,  give discourses and lead sacred songs,  processions and dances.

A great deal of cosmological thought seems to have underlain each of the Aztec sacrificial rites. Most of the sacrificial rituals took more than two people to perform. In the usual procedure of the ritual,  the sacrifice would be taken to the top of the temple. The sacrifice would then be laid on a stone slab,  a chacmool,  by four priests,  and their abdomen would be sliced open by a fifth priest with a ceremonial knife made of flint. The most common form of human sacrifice was heart-extraction. The Aztec believed that the heart (tona) was both the seat of the individual and a fragment of the Sun's heat (istli). The chacmool was a very important religious tool used during sacrifices. The cut was made in the abdomen and went through the diaphragm. The priest would grab the heart which would be placed in a bowl held by a statue of the honored god,  and the body would then be thrown down the temple's stairs. The body would land on a terrace at the base of the pyramid called an apetlatl.

Before and during the killing,  priests and audience,  gathered in the plaza below,  stabbed,  pierced and bled themselves as auto-sacrifice. Hymns, whistles, spectacular costumed dances and percussive music marked different phases of the rite.

The body parts would then be disposed of,  the viscera fed to the animals in the zoo,  and the bleeding head was placed on display in the tzompantli or the skull rack. When the consumption of individuals was involved,  the warrior who captured the enemy was given the meaty limbs while the most important flesh, the stomach and chest, were offerings to the gods.

Other types of human sacrifice,  which paid tribute to various deities,  killed the victims differently. The victim could be shot with arrows,  die in gladiatorial style fighting,  be sacrificed as a result of the Mesoamerican ballgame,  burned,  flayed after being sacrificed,  or drowned.

Those individuals who were unable to complete their ritual duties were disposed of in a much less honorary matter. This "insult to the gods" needed to be atoned,  therefore the sacrifice was slain while being chastised instead of revered. The conquistadors Cortés and Alvarado found that some of the sacrificial victims they freed "indignantly rejected [the] offer of release and demanded to be sacrificed".

Scope of human sacrifice in Aztec culture
Some post-conquest sources report that at the re-consecration of Great Pyramid of Tenochtitlan in 1487,  the Aztecs sacrificed about 80,400 prisoners over the course of four days. This number is considered by Ross Hassig,  author of Aztec Warfare,  to be an exaggeration. Hassig states "between 10,000 and 80,400 persons" were sacrificed in the ceremony. The higher estimate would average 15 sacrifices per minute during the four-day consecration. Four tables were arranged at the top so that the victims could be jettisoned down the sides of the temple.  Additionally,  some historians argue that these numbers were inaccurate as most written account of Aztec sacrifices were made by Spanish sources to justify Spain's conquest. Nonetheless,  according to Codex Telleriano-Remensis,  old Aztecs who talked with the missionaries told about a much lower figure for the reconsecration of the temple,  approximately 4,000 victims in total.

Michael Harner,  in his 1977 article The Enigma of Aztec Sacrifice,  cited an estimate by Borah of the number of persons sacrificed in central Mexico in the 15th century as high as 250,000 per year which may have been one percent of the population. Fernando de Alva Cortés Ixtlilxochitl,  a Mexica descendant and the author of Codex Ixtlilxochitl,  estimated that one in five children of the Mexica subjects was killed annually. Victor Davis Hanson argues that a claim by Don Carlos Zumárraga of 20,000 per annum is "more plausible". Other scholars believe that,  since the Aztecs often tried to intimidate their enemies,  it is more likely that they could have inflated the number as a propaganda tool. The same can be said for Bernal Díaz's inflated calculations when,  in a state of visual shock,  he grossly miscalculated the number of skulls at one of the seven Tenochtitlan tzompantlis. The counter argument is that both the Aztecs and Diaz were very precise in the recording of the many other details of Aztec life,  and inflation or propaganda would be unlikely. According to the Florentine Codex,  fifty years before the conquest the Aztecs burnt the skulls of the former tzompantli. Archeologist Eduardo Matos Moctezuma has unearthed and studied some tzompantlis. In 2003,  archaeologist Elizabeth Graham noted that the largest number of skulls yet found at a single tzompantli was only about a dozen. In 2015,  Raùl Barrera Rodríguez,  archeologist and director of the Urban Archaeology Program at National Institute of Anthropology and History (INAH),  discovered a skull rack and skull towers next to the Templo Mayor complex that could have held thousands of skulls. However, as of 2020, only 603 skulls have ever been found associated with human sacrifice.

Every Aztec warrior would have to provide at least one prisoner for sacrifice. All the male population was trained to be warriors,  but only the few who succeeded in providing captives could become full-time members of the warrior elite. Accounts also state that several young warriors could unite to capture a single prisoner,  which suggests that capturing prisoners for sacrifice was challenging.

There is still much debate as to what social groups constituted the usual victims of these sacrifices. It is often assumed that all victims were 'disposable' commoners or foreigners. However,  slaves – a major source of victims – were not a permanent class but rather persons from any level of Aztec society who had fallen into debt or committed some crime. Likewise,  most of the earliest accounts talk of prisoners of war of diverse social status,  and concur that virtually all child sacrifices were locals of noble lineage,  offered by their own parents.  That women and children were not excluded from potential victims is attested by a tzompantli found in 2015 at Templo Mayor in the Aztec capital Tenochtitlan.

It is doubtful if many victims came from far afield. In 1454,  the Aztec government forbade the slaying of captives from distant lands at the capital's temples. Duran's informants told him that sacrifices were consequently 'nearly always ... friends of the [Royal] House' – meaning warriors from allied states.

Sacrifices to specific gods

Huitzilopochtli

Huitzilopochtli was the tribal deity of the Mexica and,  as such,  he represented the character of the Mexican people and was often identified with the sun at the zenith,  and with warfare,  who burned down towns and carried a fire-breathing serpent,  Xiuhcoatl. He was considered the primary god of the south and a manifestation of the sun,  and a counterpart of the black Tezcatlipoca,  the primary god of the north,  "a domain associated with Mictlan,  the underworld of the dead".

Huitzilopochtli was worshipped at the Templo Mayor,  which was the primary religious structure of the Aztec capital of Tenochtitlan. The Templo Mayor consisted of twin pyramids,  one for Huitzilopochtli and one for the rain god Tlaloc (discussed below).

When the Aztecs sacrificed people to Huitzilopochtli (the god with warlike aspects) the victim would be placed on a sacrificial stone. The priest would then cut through the abdomen with an obsidian or flint blade. The heart would be torn out still beating and held towards the sky in honor to the Sun-God. The body would then be pushed down the pyramid where the Coyolxauhqui stone could be found. The Coyolxauhqui Stone recreates the story of Coyolxauhqui,  Huitzilopochtli's sister who was dismembered at the base of a mountain,  just as the sacrificial victims were. The body would be carried away and either cremated or given to the warrior responsible for the capture of the victim. He would either cut the body in pieces and send them to important people as an offering,  or use the pieces for ritual cannibalism. The warrior would thus ascend one step in the hierarchy of the Aztec social classes,  a system that rewarded successful warriors.

During the festival of Panquetzaliztli,  of which Huitzilopochtli was the patron,  sacrificial victims were adorned in the manner of Huitzilopochtli's costume and blue body paint,  before their hearts would be sacrificially removed. Representations of Huitzilopochtli called teixiptla were also worshipped,  the most significant being the one at the Templo Mayor which was made of dough mixed with sacrificial blood.

Tezcatlipoca

Tezcatlipoca was generally considered the most powerful god,  the god of night,  sorcery and destiny (the name tezcatlipoca means "smoking mirror",  or "obsidian"),  and the god of the north. The Aztecs believed that Tezcatlipoca created war to provide food and drink to the gods. Tezcatlipoca was known by several epithets including "the Enemy" and "the Enemy of Both Sides",  which stress his affinity for discord. He was also deemed the enemy of Quetzalcoatl,  but an ally of Huitzilopochtli. Tezcatlipoca had the power to forgive sins and to relieve disease,  or to release a man from the fate assigned to him by his date of birth; however,  nothing in Tezcatlipoca's nature compelled him to do so. He was capricious and often brought about reversals of fortune,  such as bringing drought and famine. He turned himself into Mixcoatl,  the god of the hunt,  to make fire. To the Aztecs,  he was an all-knowing,  all-seeing nearly all-powerful god. One of his names can be translated as "He Whose Slaves We Are".

Some captives were sacrificed to Tezcatlipoca in ritual gladiatorial combat. The victim was tethered in place and given a mock weapon. He died fighting against up to four fully armed jaguar knights and eagle warriors.

During the 20-day month of Toxcatl,  a young impersonator of Tezcatlipoca would be sacrificed. Throughout a year,  this youth would be dressed as Tezcatlipoca and treated as a living incarnation of the god. The youth would represent Tezcatlipoca on earth; he would get four beautiful women as his companions until he was killed. In the meantime he walked through the streets of Tenochtitlan playing a flute. On the day of the sacrifice,  a feast would be held in Tezcatlipoca's honor. The young man would climb the pyramid,  break his flute and surrender his body to the priests. Sahagún compared it to the Christian Easter.

Huehueteotl/Xiuhtecuhtli 
Xiuhtecuhtli is the god of fire and heat and in many cases is considered to be an aspect of Huehueteotl,  the "Old God" and another fire deity.

Both Xiuhtecuhtli and Huehueteotl were worshipped during the festival of Izcalli. For ten days preceding the festival various animals would be captured by the Aztecs,  to be thrown in the hearth on the night of celebration.

To appease Huehueteotl,  the fire god and a senior deity,  the Aztecs had a ceremony where they prepared a large feast,  at the end of which they would burn captives; before they died they would be taken from the fire and their hearts would be cut out. Motolinía and Sahagún reported that the Aztecs believed that if they did not placate Huehueteotl,  a plague of fire would strike their city. The sacrifice was considered an offering to the deity.

Xiuhtecuhtli was also worshipped during the New Fire Ceremony,  which occurred every 52 years,  and prevented the ending of the world. During the festival priests would march to the top of the volcano Huixachtlan and when the constellation "the fire drill" (Orion's belt) rose over the mountain,  a man would be sacrificed. The victim's heart would be ripped from his body and a ceremonial hearth would be lit in the hole in his chest. This flame would then be used to light all of the ceremonial fires in various temples throughout the city of Tenochtitlan.

Tlaloc

Tlaloc is the god of rain,  water,  and earthly fertility. The Aztecs believed that if sacrifices were not supplied for Tlaloc,  rain would not come,  their crops would not flourish,  and leprosy and rheumatism,  diseases caused by Tlaloc,  would infest the village.

Archaeologists have found the remains of at least 42 children sacrificed to Tlaloc at the Great Pyramid of Tenochtitlan. Many of the children suffered from serious injuries before their death,  they would have to have been in significant pain as Tlaloc required the tears of the young as part of the sacrifice. The priests made the children cry during their way to immolation: a good omen that Tlaloc would wet the earth in the raining season.

In the Florentine Codex,  also known as General History of the Things of New Spain,  Sahagún wrote:

Xipe Totec 

Xipe Totec,  known as "Our Lord the Flayed One",  is the god of rebirth,  agriculture,  the seasons,  and craftsmen.

Xipe Totec was worshipped extensively during the festival of Tlacaxipehualiztli,  in which captured warriors and slaves were sacrificed in the ceremonial center of the city of Tenochtitlan. For forty days prior to their sacrifice one victim would be chosen from each ward of the city to act as ixiptla,  dress and live as Xipe Totec. The victims were then taken to the Xipe Totec's temple where their hearts would be removed,  their bodies dismembered,  and their body parts divided up to be later eaten. Prior to death and dismemberment the victim's skin would be removed and worn by individuals who traveled throughout the city fighting battles and collecting gifts from the citizens.

Calendar of sacrifice

52-year cycle 
The cycle of 52 years was central to Mesoamerican cultures. The Nahua's religious beliefs were based on a great fear that the universe would collapse after each cycle if the gods were not strong enough. Every 52 years a special New Fire ceremony was performed. All fires were extinguished and at midnight a human sacrifice was made. The Aztecs then waited for the sunrise. If the Sun appeared it meant that the sacrifices for this cycle had been enough. A fire was ignited on the body of a victim,  and this new fire was taken to every house, city, and town. Rejoicing was general: a new cycle of 52 years was beginning and the end of the world had been postponed, at least for another 52-year cycle.

Sacrifices were made on specific days. Sahagún,  Juan Bautista de Pomar and Motolinía report that the Aztecs had 18 festivities each year, one for each Aztec month. The table below shows the festivals of the 18-month year of the Aztec calendar and the deities with which the festivals were associated.

Primary sources
Visual accounts of Aztec sacrificial practice are principally found in codices and some Aztec statuary. Many visual renderings were created for Spanish patrons,  and thus may reflect European preoccupations and prejudices. Produced during the 16th century,  the most prominent codices include the Ríos,  Tudela,  Telleriano-Remensis,  Magliabechiano,  and Sahagún's Florentine. A contrast is offered in the few Aztec statues that depict sacrificial victims,  which show an Aztec understanding of sacrifice. Rather than showing a preoccupation with debt repayment,  they emphasize the mythological narratives that resulted in human sacrifices,  and often underscore the political legitimacy of the Aztec state. For instance,  the Coyolxauhqui stone found at the foot of the Templo Mayor commemorates the mythic slaying of Huitzilopochli's sister for the matricide of Coatlicue; it also,  as Cecelia Kline has pointed out,  "served to warn potential enemies of their certain fate should they try to obstruct the state's military ambitions".

In addition to the accounts provided by Sahagún and Durán,  there are other important texts to be considered. Juan de Grijalva,  Hernán Cortés,  Juan Díaz,  Bernal Díaz,  Andrés de Tapia,  Francisco de Aguilar,  Ruy González and the Anonymous Conqueror detailed their eyewitness accounts of human sacrifice in their writings about the Conquest of the Aztec Empire. However,  as the conquerors often used such accounts to portray the Aztecs in a negative light,  and thus justifying their colonization,  the accuracy of these sources has been called into question. Martyr d'Anghiera,  Lopez de Gomara,  Oviedo y Valdes and Illescas,  while not in Mesoamerica,  wrote their accounts based on interviews with the participants. Bartolomé de las Casas and Sahagún arrived later to New Spain but had access to direct testimony,  especially of the indigenous people.

Juan de Grijalva and Juan Díaz
Juan de Grijalva was one of the first Spaniards to explore Mexico and traveled on his expedition in 1518 with Juan Díaz. Diaz wrote Itinerario de Grijalva before 1520,  in which he describes the aftermath of a sacrifice on an island off the coast of Veracruz. He said, When he reached said tower the Captain asked him why such deeds were committed there and the Indian answered that it was done as a kind of sacrifice and gave to understand that the victims were beheaded on the wide stone; that the blood was poured into the vase and that the heart was taken out of the breast and burnt and offered to the said idol. The fleshy parts of the arms and legs were cut off and eaten. This was done to the enemies with whom they were at war.

Bernal Díaz

Bernal Díaz corroborates Juan Díaz's history:

In The Conquest of New Spain Díaz recounted that,  after landing on the coast,  they came across a temple dedicated to Tezcatlipoca. "That day they had sacrificed two boys,  cutting open their chests and offering their blood and hearts to that accursed idol". Díaz narrates several more sacrificial descriptions on the later Cortés expedition. Arriving at Cholula,  they find "cages of stout wooden bars ... full of men and boys who were being fattened for the sacrifice at which their flesh would be eaten". When the conquistadors reached Tenochtitlan,  Díaz described the sacrifices at the Great Pyramid:

According to Bernal Díaz,  the chiefs of the surrounding towns,  for example Cempoala,  would complain on numerous occasions to Cortés about the perennial need to supply the Aztecs with victims for human sacrifice. It is clear from his description of their fear and resentment toward the Mexicas that,  in their opinion,  it was no honor to surrender their kinsmen to be sacrificed by them.

At the town of Cingapacigna Cortez told the chiefs that for them to become friends and brothers of the Spaniards they must end the practice of making sacrifices. According to Bernal Diaz: 

On meeting a group of inhabitants from Cempoala who gave Cortes and his men food and invited them to their village:

Hernán Cortés and the Anonymous Conquistador 
Cortés was the Spanish conquistador whose expedition to Mexico in 1519 led to the fall of the Aztecs,  and led to the conquering of vast sections of Mexico on behalf of the Crown of Castile.

Cortés wrote of Aztec sacrifice on numerous occasions,  one of which in his Letters,  he states:

The Anonymous Conquistador was an unknown travel companion of Cortés who wrote Narrative of Some Things of New Spain and of the Great City of Temestitan which details Aztec sacrifices.

The Anonymous Conquistador wrote,  They lead him to the temple,  where they dance and carry on joyously,  and the man about to be sacrificed dances and carries on like the rest. At length the man who offers the sacrifice strips him naked,  and leads him at once to the stairway of the tower where is the stone idol. Here they stretch him on his back,  tying the hands to the sides and fastening the legs ... Soon comes the sacrificing priest—and this is no small office among them—armed with a stone knife,  which cuts like steel,  and is as big as one of our large knives. He plunges the knife into the breast,  opens it,  and tears out the heart hot and palpitating. And this as quickly as one might cross himself. At this point the chief priest of the temple takes it,  and anoints the mouth of the principal idol with the blood; then filling his hand with it he flings it towards the sun,  or towards some star,  if it be night. Then he anoints the mouths of all the other idols of wood and stone,  and sprinkles blood on the cornice of the chapel of the principal idol. Afterwards they burn the heart,  preserving the ashes as a great relic,  and likewise they burn the body of the sacrifice,  but these ashes are kept apart from those of the heart in a different vase.

Archaeological evidence of human sacrifice 
Modern excavations in Mexico City have found evidence of human sacrifice in the form of hundreds of skulls at the site of old temples.

Other human remains found in the Great Temple of Tenochtitlan contribute to the evidence of human sacrifice through osteologic information. Indentations in the rib cage of a set of remains reveal the act of accessing the heart through the abdominal cavity,  which correctly follows images from the codices in the pictorial representation of sacrifice.

Proposed explanations

Ecological explanation

Different anthropological or other sources have attempted to explain a possible ecological explanation of the need for human sacrifices to supplement overall Aztec diet. Harner's main argument lies within his claim that cannibalism is needed to assist the diet of the Aztecs. He claimed that very high population pressure and an emphasis on maize agriculture,  without domesticated herbivores,  led to a deficiency of essential amino acids amongst the Aztecs. As population increased and the amount of available game decreased,  the Aztecs had to compete with other carnivorous mammals,  such as dogs,  to find food. Harner believes that although intensified agricultural practices provided the Aztec society a surplus of carbohydrates,  they did not provide sufficient nutritional balance; for this reason,  the cannibalistic consumption of sacrificed humans was needed to supply an appropriate amount of protein per individual. Harris,  author of Cannibals and Kings,  has propagated the claim originally proposed by Harner,  that the flesh of the victims was a part of an aristocratic diet as a reward,  since the Aztec diet was lacking in proteins.

However,  Bernard Ortiz Montellano offers a counter argument and points out the faults of Harner's sources. First off,  Ortiz challenges Harner's claim of the Aztecs needing to compete with other carnivorous mammals for protein packed food. Many other types of foods were available to the Aztecs,  including meat from salamanders,  fowls,  armadillos,  and weasels. These resources were also plenty available due to their need to subsist in Lake Texcoco,  the place where the Aztecs had created their home. In addition,  even if no herbivores were available to eat,  the nutrients needed were found in the leaves and seeds of amaranth which also provided protein. Lastly, the Aztecs had a highly structured system in which chinampas and tribute provided a surplus of materials and therefore ensured the Aztec were able to meet their caloric needs.

Ortiz's argument helps to frame and evaluate the gaps within Harner's argument. Part of the issue with Harner's reasoning for Aztec use of cannibalism was the lack of reliability of his sources. Harner recognized the numbers he used may be contradicting or conflicting with other sources,  yet he continued to use these sources and claimed them as reliable. Ortiz qualifies Harner's sources as Spanish propaganda,  and states the need to critique primary sources of interactions with the Aztecs. By dehumanizing and villainizing Aztec culture,  the Spaniards were able to justify their own actions for conquest. Therefore,  encounters with sacrificial cannibalism were said to be grossly exaggerated and Harner used the sources to aid his argument. However,  it is unlikely that the Spanish conquerors would need to invent additional cannibalism to justify their actions given that human sacrifice already existed,  as attested by archeological evidence. Overall,  ecological factors alone are not sufficient to account for human sacrifice and,  more recently,  it is posited that religious beliefs have a significant effect on motivation.

Religious explanation 

Sacrifices were ritualistic and symbolic acts accompanying huge feasts and festivals,  and were a way to properly honor the gods. Victims usually died in the "center stage" amid the splendor of dancing troupes,  percussion orchestras,  elaborate costumes and decorations,  carpets of flowers,  crowds of thousands of commoners,  and all the assembled elite. Aztec texts frequently refer to human sacrifice as neteotoquiliztli,  "the desire to be regarded as a god". These members of the society became an ixiptla—that is,  a god's representative,  image or idol.

For each festival,  at least one of the victims took on the paraphernalia,  habits,  and attributes of the god or goddess whom they were dying to honor or appease. Through this performance,  it was said that the divinity had been given 'human form'—that the god now had an ixitli (face).  Duran says such victims were 'worshipped ... as the deity' or 'as though they had been gods'. Even whilst still alive,  ixiptla victims were honored,  hallowed and addressed very highly.  Particularly the young man who was indoctrinated for a year to submit himself to Tezcatlipoca's temple was the Aztec equivalent of a celebrity,  being greatly revered and adored to the point of people "kissing the ground" when he passed by.

Posthumously,  their remains were treated as actual relics of the gods which explains why victims' skulls,  bones and skin were often painted,  bleached,  stored and displayed,  or else used as ritual masks and oracles. For example,  Diego Duran's informants told him that whoever wore the skin of the victim who had portrayed god Xipe (Our Lord the Flayed One) felt he was wearing a holy relic. He considered himself 'divine'.

Political explanation
Politically, human sacrifice was important in Aztec culture as a way to represent a social hierarchy between their own culture and the enemies surrounding their city. Additionally,  it was a way to structure the society of the Aztec culture itself. The hierarchy of cities like Tenochtitlan were tiered with the Tlatoani (emperor) on the top,  the remaining nobles (pipiltin) next who managed the land owned by the emperor. Then the warriors,  the pochteca (merchants),  commoners and farmers. Then the lowest level of the hierarchy consisted of slaves and indentured servants. The only way of achieving social mobility was through successful performance as a warrior. This shows how important capturing enemies for sacrifice was as it was the singular way of achieving some type of "nobility".

Within the system of organization based on hierarchy,  there was also a social expectation contributing to the status of an individual at the time of their sacrifice. An individual was punished if unable to confidently address their own sacrifice,  i.e. the person acted cowardly beforehand instead of brave. Then,  instead of being sacrificed honorably,  their lowly death paralleled their new lowly status. Where one's body traveled in the afterlife also depended on the type of death awarded to the individual. Those who died while being sacrificed or while battling in war went to the second-highest heaven,  while those who died of illness were the lowest in the hierarchy. Those going through the lowest hierarchy of death were required to undergo numerous torturous trials and journeys,  only to culminate in a somber underworld. Additionally,  death during Flower Wars was considered much more noble than death during regular military endeavors.

See also
 Aztec religion
Human sacrifice in Maya culture
 Human trophy taking in Mesoamerica

Footnotes

Bibliography

 
 
 
 
 
 
Ingham, John M. "Human Sacrifice at Tenochtitln." Society for Comparative Studies in Society and History 26 (1984): 379–400.

External links
 
 " The Custom of Aztec Burial" is a part of the Tovar Codex from around 1585

Aztec society
Aztec mythology and religion
Human sacrifice

Sacrificios Aztecas (mexicas)